Fotis Kitsos (born 31 March 2003) is a Greek professional footballer who plays as a left-back for Cypriot club Omonia, on loan from Olympiacos.

Career
At age 18, Kitsos was promoted from Olympiacos's youth team by first-team manager Pedro Martins, who was impressed with his speed and good technique. He made his debut in Super League, as a member of the first team, as a late substitute in a 3-1 home win game against Panetolikos.

On 31 August 2022, he joined Cypriot club Omonia on a one-year loan.

Career statistics

Club

Notes

Honours
Olympiacos
Super League Greece: 2021–22

References

2003 births
Living people
Footballers from Athens
Greece youth international footballers
Association football defenders
Greek footballers
Greek expatriate footballers
Super League Greece players
Super League Greece 2 players
Olympiacos F.C. players
Olympiacos F.C. B players
AC Omonia players
Cypriot First Division players
Expatriate footballers in Cyprus
Greek expatriate sportspeople in Cyprus